Src kinase-associated phosphoprotein 1 is an adapter protein that in humans is encoded by the SKAP1 gene.

This gene encodes a T cell adapter protein, a class of intracellular molecules with modular domains capable of recruiting additional proteins but that exhibit no intrinsic enzymatic activity. The encoded protein contains a unique N-terminal region followed by a PH domain and C-terminal SH3 domain. Along with the adhesion and degranulation-promoting adapter protein, the encoded protein plays a critical role in inside-out signaling by coupling T-cell antigen receptor stimulation to the activation of integrins.

The demonstration that SKAP1 regulates LFA-1 adhesion was made by retroviral infection  and by the SKAP1 deficient mouse.   Additional work has implicated SKAP1 in binding to the exchange factor RasGRP1 and in regulating ERK activation in T-cells.

Interactions 

SKAP1 has been shown to interact with FYN, PTPRC and FYB.

References

Further reading